Fabián Larry Estoyanoff Poggio (born 27 September 1982) is a Uruguayan professional footballer who plays as a winger for Centro Atlético Fénix.

Club career
Born in Montevideo, Estoyanoff started his career at Centro Atlético Fénix in 2000, and was loaned to Peñarol two years later. In 2005 he signed a five-year contract with Valencia CF in Spain, but never represented the club during his tenure, which included several loan spells.

Estoyanoff made his La Liga debut in the 2005–06 season, appearing regularly as Cádiz CF were relegated. The following campaign he also featured consistently for Deportivo de La Coruña (although mainly as a substitute), scoring the game's only goal in a start against RCD Mallorca at home, through a penalty.

Valencia loaned Estoyanoff again for 2007–08, and he started out with Real Valladolid, where a lack of playing time prompted another loan, with a return to Uruguay and Peñarol in January 2008. There, he once again teamed up with Carlos Bueno; he played in Spain as a non-foreigner, having received an Italian passport.

Estoyanoff was finally released by Valencia in June 2008, eventually agreeing on a move to Panionios FC, having a successful first season in the Super League Greece. In 2010, the 28-year-old re-joined former side Peñarol on loan, and the move was made permanent the following year.

In January 2015, Estoyanoff signed for Al Nassr FC in the Saudi Professional League. On 5 May, after his team had suffered a 1–3 home loss to Lekhwiya SC for the AFC Champions League, he attacked opposing player Nam Tae-hee from behind in the tunnel, being subsequently fined in 50% of his salary.

International career
Estoyanoff made his debut for Uruguay on 25 July 2001 at that year's Copa América, playing the final 15 minutes in a 2–1 semi-final defeat against Mexico. Subsequently, he appeared at the 2004 – scoring twice for the eventual third-placed nation– and 2007 continental tournaments.

Personal life
Estoyanoff's grandfather, Dimitar Stoyanov, was a Bulgarian stock breeder from the Sofia Valley who emigrated to Uruguay during the Balkan Wars (1912–13).

Career statistics

International

Scores and results list Uruguay's goal tally first, score column indicates score after each Estoyanoff goal.

References

External links

National team data 

1982 births
Living people
Uruguayan people of Bulgarian descent
Uruguayan footballers
Footballers from Montevideo
Association football wingers
Uruguayan Primera División players
Centro Atlético Fénix players
Peñarol players
La Liga players
Valencia CF players
Cádiz CF players
Deportivo de La Coruña players
Real Valladolid players
Super League Greece players
Panionios F.C. players
Saudi Professional League players
Al Nassr FC players
Uruguay international footballers
2001 Copa América players
2004 Copa América players
2007 Copa América players
Uruguayan expatriate footballers
Expatriate footballers in Spain
Expatriate footballers in Greece
Expatriate footballers in Saudi Arabia
Uruguayan expatriate sportspeople in Spain
Uruguayan expatriate sportspeople in Greece
Uruguayan expatriate sportspeople in Saudi Arabia